Tammaro Cassandro (born 5 April 1993) is an Italian sport shooter.

He participated at the 2018 ISSF World Shooting Championships, winning a medal.

References

External links

Living people
1993 births
Italian male sport shooters
Skeet shooters
Universiade silver medalists for Italy
Universiade medalists in shooting
Medalists at the 2013 Summer Universiade
Shooters at the 2020 Summer Olympics
20th-century Italian people
21st-century Italian people